707 Operations is a railway preservation group based in Melbourne, Australia. The volunteer organisation was established in 1980 to restore R class locomotive R707. The company has its own section of the Newport Workshops that is used for storing carriages and locomotives when not in use for trips (charter or regular). They are located in roads 7 and 8 of the Newport West Block Workshops.

707 Operations run regular trips across the broad gauge rail network in Victoria and also charter trains. People who motorcade the train to photograph it are asked to consider donating $10 towards the costs of running the train. This has been controversial among the railway fraternity. For the donation, 707 Operations provide a detailed schedule and tour notes 24 hours prior to departure and SMS updates should the train fall behind schedule in excess of 30 minutes.

History
In 1980, a committee of six men got together to inspect the withdrawn steam locomotive R707 at Newport Workshops. This locomotive had been withdrawn from service in 1974. After close examination of the locomotive, which showed some disrepair, a proposal was put forward to VicRail for restoration with work commencing in 1981. The restored locomotive made its debut on a return trip to Bacchus Marsh in July 1985.

Operations
Today 707 Operations run heritage special trains in Victoria. In 2020 most trips were cancelled due to COVID restrictions however in 2022, 707 Operations is running a number of popular mainline day trips and sleeping car trips around Country Victoria and Tocumwal (NSW). Destinations include Bendigo, Bacchus Marsh, Quambatook and the Silo Art Trail, Tocumwal, Ballarat, Swan Hill, Echuca and Seymour.

Fleet
After the restoration of R707, the organisation expanded their fleet further with R753 being bought as well as diesel locomotives F204, T413 and Y127. The organisation owns former West Coast Railways S and Z type carriages as well as South Australian Railways carriage 708 for use on special trips. No West Coast Railways liveried cars remain with all S and Z type cars having been repainted in 707 Operations red. A list of the entire fleet of rolling stock is shown below.

R707, R753
W241, W244 (W241 Sold to Mornington Railway, W244 given back to Victrack for Re-Allocation [Surplus to use])
F208
S306
T387, T392, T413
Y108, Y127
H3, H5
A62
Power Vans: PCP294, D318
S and Z carriages: ACZ255, BS205/212/215, BRS224, BZ270
ACN 45, ACN 48, BRN 43, BN 5, BN 22
ex The Overland and The Vinelander carriages: SJ284, JTA6 (Kuldalai) Victoria 
ex South Australian Railways carriage 708, purchased from Northern Rivers Railroad and 783 (Lowanna), purchased from the Victorian Goldfields Railway in 2022.
E sleeping carriages: Wando, Buchan
Commonwealth Railways stainless steel carriage stock: DF935 (not operational)

Locomotives

Operational carriages

References

External links
Official website

Heritage railways in Australia
1980 establishments in Australia